Dhruvsatya is a term in Hindi that means "eternal truth". The word "dhruv", which literally means pole star, is used in conjunction with "satya", which means truth.  Dhruvsatya means the truth that is as immovable and eternal as the position of the "polestar".  The term is widely used in Hindi literature and can be found in Premchand's legendary works.

Hindi words and phrases